Isca Valley is a narrow ice-free valley lying next west of Ituna Valley and  east-northeast of Haven Mountain in the Britannia Range, Antarctica. It was named in association with "Britannia" by a University of Waikato geological party, 1978–79, led by Michael Selby. "Isca" is a historical name used in Roman Britain for the River Exe.

References

Valleys of Oates Land